Lakshay Thareja is an Indian cricketer. He made his List A debut for Delhi in the 2018–19 Vijay Hazare Trophy on 8 October 2018.

References

External links
 

Year of birth missing (living people)
Living people
Indian cricketers
Delhi cricketers
Place of birth missing (living people)